Elazığspor is a Turkish professional football club located in Elazığ and currently competes in the TFF Third League. They previously played their home games at Elazığ Atatürk Stadium in Elazığ, which had a maximum capacity of 13,923. The club was founded in 1967. They have also played in the Super League many times in the past.

History
Elazığspor was founded in 1967 when three clubs (Merkez Gençlik, Güvenspor and Harputspor) were united to form a strong team for the city of Elazığ. The club's emblem refers to a famous local dance called Çayda Çıra. This dance is performed with candles in the hands. Elazığspor's main rivals are Malatyaspor. The cities Elazığ and Malatya, were Malatyaspor play, are neighboring cities. Due to the rivalry meaning a lot to those fan bases, extra security is almost a necessity to make sure of safety.  Due to the fan bases dislike for each other, sometimes the visiting team's fans will not be allowed to attend the game due to security reasons. Usually, there will be around 30 journalists from Malatya to attend the game whenever the rivalry is being hosted by Elazığspor. The “Doğunun derbisi” has become one of the biggest football rivalries in Turkey. 

One friendly match that Elazığspor played versus Diyarbakırspor on September 5, 2011 turned tragic. Fans of both teams threw stones and hard objects at each other. One lieutenant and 1 expert sergeant died to the fan's behaviors. A total of 6 people were injured. These events happened during the middle of the match, as the game had to be delayed until the events that were going on came down. The club has played in the Second and Third Leagues for several years. Finally in 2002, the club was promoted to the Turkish First Football League. However, in 2004, they were relegated to the TFF First League again. They were relegated to the TFF Second League in 2008 after finishing in 16th place.

In January 2019, Elazığspor hit the news after signing 22 players in 2 hours on 30 January, after negotiating the end of a transfer ban imposed by the Turkish Football Federation. The club, which made so many transfers in such a short time, entered the Guinness Book of Records.

The club withdrew from the 2019-20 2. Lig after the 2020 Elazığ earthquake. Next season, the club was allowed to compete in the 2020-21 2. Lig.

League participation
 Turkish Super League: 2002–04, 2012–2014
 TFF First League: 1974–82, 1983–85, 1986–87, 1990–92, 1995–02, 2004–08, 2011–12, 2014–2019
 TFF Second League: 1968–75, 1985–86, 1987–90, 1992–95, 2008–11, 2019–2021
 TFF Third League: 1982–83, 2021–2022, 2022-2023

Current squad

Notable players
Bosnia and Herzegovina
 Aldin Čajić
 Ivan Sesar
 Ognjen Vranješ 
France
 Julien Faubert 
Netherlands
 Marvin Zeegelaar 
Sweden
 Emir Kujović
Turkey
 Serdar Gürler 
 Ersan Gülüm
 Halil Akbunar

Managers
  Milorad Mitroviç (Sep 5, 2003 - Oct 30, 2003)
  Güvenç Kurtar (Oct 31, 2003 – Jun 30, 2004)
 Erol Tok (Aug 22, 2007 – Feb 19, 2008)
 Şerafettin Tutaş (Apr 9, 2008 – Jun 30 2008)
 Osman Özköylü (June 10, 2010 – Oct 10, 2011)
 Hüsnü Özkara (Oct 14, 2011 – March 29, 2012)
 Bülent Uygun (March 30, 2012 – Oct 8, 2012)
 Yılmaz Vural (Oct 10, 2012 – May 20, 2013)
 Trond Sollied (June 24, 2013 – Oct 27, 2013)
 Okan Buruk (Oct 31, 2013 – Jun 2, 2014)
 Ümit Özat (Aug 8, 2014 – Apr 30, 2015)
 Bayram Bektaş (Apr 30, 2015 - Nov 12, 2015)
  İbrahim Üzülmez (Nov 19, 2015 - Dec 31, 2015)
  Kemal Özdeş (Jan 4, 2016 - Jan 15, 2016)
  Coşkun Demirbakan (Jan 21, 2016 - March 4, 2016)
  Ogün Temizkanoğlu (March 4, 2016 - Nov 10, 2016)
  Bayram Bektaş (Nov 11, 2016 - May 20, 2017)
  Mehmet Altıparmak (July 2, 2017 - Nov 2, 2017)
  Hüseyin Kalpar (Nov 7, 2017 - Apr 9, 2018)
  Muammer Sürmeli (Apr 13, 2017 - May 31, 2018)
  Orhan Kaynak (Aug 8, 2018 - Jan 24, 2019)
  Erhan Altın (Feb 13, 2018 - Mar 3, 2019)
  Serhat Gülpınar (Mar 6, 2018 - Apr 22, 2019)
  Sefer Yılmaz (Apr 25, 2019 - Oct 30, 2019)
  Levent Eriş (Nov 1, 2019 - Oct 29, 2020)
  Orhan Kaynak (Oct 29, 2020 - Dec 31, 2020)
  Ümit Tekoğlu (Jan 4, 2021 - Feb 18, 2021)
  Cafer Aydın (Feb 22, 2021 - Jun 30, 2021)
  Kenan Kamaç (Sep 2, 2021 - Sep 21, 2021)
  Cafer Aydın (Sep 22, 2021 - Feb 15, 2022)
  Alaettin Tutaş (Feb 19, 2022 - Jun 30, 2021)
  Ramazan Çelik (Jul 22, 2022 - )

References

External links
Official website
Elazığspor on TFF.org

 
Association football clubs established in 1967
Sport in Elazığ
Elazığspor
1967 establishments in Turkey